Frank Raymond Devlin (October 27, 1867 – August 25, 1945) was a Canadian-American lawyer and politician.

Biography
Frank R. Devlin was born in Windsor, Ontario on October 27, 1867, and grew up in Vallejo, California.

He was elected to the California State Assembly in 1904, serving for two terms.

He was appointed to the California Board of Railroad Commissioners by Governor Hiram Johnson on January 3, 1915.

He died at his home in Berkeley on August 25, 1945.

References

1867 births
1945 deaths
California Progressives (1912)
Republican Party members of the California State Assembly
Politicians from Windsor, Ontario